Rita Kelly (born 1953) is an Irish poet from Ballinasloe in eastern County Galway who now lives in an old lock house along the river Barrow between Athy and Carlow. She has published several collections of poetry and has been featured in a number of magazines and journals. Her poems Mé sa ghluaisteán leat (In the car with you) and Is bronntanas na maidine thú (You are the morning's gift) were featured in Filíocht Ghrá na Gaeilge. She was married to the writer Eoghan Ó Tuairisc from 1972 until his death in 1982.

Bibliography

 Dialann sa Díseart 1981
 An Bealach Éadóigh 1984
 Fare Well - Beir Beannacht 1990
 Travelling West 2000

References
 Filíocht Ghrá na Gaeilge/Love Poems in Irish (eag./ed.) Ciarán Mac Murchaidh, 2008. 

Living people
People from Ballinasloe
People from Galway (city)
Irish poets
1953 births
Irish women poets
20th-century Irish-language poets
21st-century Irish-language poets